Vinícius Conceição da Silva (born March 7, 1977 in Porto Alegre), or simply Vinícius, is a Brazilian central defender. He currently plays for Caxias do Sul.

Honours
Campeonato Gaúcho in 1997, 2003, 2004, 2005 with Internacional
Primeira Liga Champion in 1999–2000 with Sporting Clube de Portugal
Korean Super Cup Winner in 2006 with Ulsan Hyundai Horang-i
Campeonato Mineiro in 2007 with Clube Atlético Mineiro

External links
Vinícius at Atletico.com.br 

Vinícius at Placar 
Vinícius at CBF 
Vinícius at Guardian Stats Centre

1977 births
Living people
Brazilian footballers
Brazil under-20 international footballers
Brazilian expatriate footballers
Sport Club Internacional players
Primeira Liga players
Sporting CP footballers
Standard Liège players
Belgian Pro League players
Fluminense FC players
Ulsan Hyundai FC players
K League 1 players
Sociedade Esportiva e Recreativa Caxias do Sul players
Clube Atlético Mineiro players
Clube Náutico Capibaribe players
Esporte Clube Bahia players
Expatriate footballers in South Korea
Expatriate footballers in Belgium
Expatriate footballers in Portugal
Brazilian expatriate sportspeople in South Korea
Association football defenders
Footballers from Porto Alegre